Back to Hannibal: The Return of Tom Sawyer and Huckleberry Finn is a 1990 American television family drama film directed by Paul Krasny and written by Roy Johansen, based on The Adventures of Tom Sawyer and Adventures of Huckleberry Finn by Mark Twain. It aired on the Disney Channel on October 21, 1990. In the film, Tom Sawyer and Huck Finn work to save their friend Jim from a charge of murder.

Plot

Cast

Raphael Sbarge as Tom Sawyer
Megan Follows as Becky Thatcher
Mitchell Anderson as Huckleberry Finn
Zachary Bennett as Marcus
Val Safron as Aunt Lucille
Ned Beatty as Duke Of Bridgewater
Paul Winfield as Jim Watson
Joseph Bova as King of France
William Windom as Judge
Terry Snyed as Samuel Biggs

Reception

The pilot gained a mixed reception from critics.

References

External links

1990 television films
1990 films
1990 drama films
1990s children's drama films
1990s English-language films
American children's drama films
Films based on Adventures of Huckleberry Finn
Films based on The Adventures of Tom Sawyer
Films based on multiple works of a series
Disney Channel original films
American drama television films
Films directed by Paul Krasny
Films scored by Lee Holdridge
Films set in Missouri
Films shot in Missouri
Television films based on books
Television shows based on works by Mark Twain
1990s American films